Rory Michael Bourke   (born July 14, 1942 in Cleveland, Ohio is an American country music songwriter and music publisher.

Bourke moved to Nashville in 1964 and worked for a period in the promotional department of Mercury Records.

His songwriting career took off in the early 1970s and he soon racked up tracks recorded by Charlie Rich, Elvis Presley, Lynn Anderson, Billy Crash Craddock, Olivia Newton-John, and many others.  His most successful song was "The Most Beautiful Girl", cowritten with Billy Sherrill and Norro Wilson,  recorded by Rich and a number-one record in both the country and pop fields. He co-wrote "Patch It Up" with Eddie Rabbitt and wrote "Your Love's Been A Long Time Coming," both of which were recorded by Elvis Presley.

Bourke's other hit songs include  "A Little Good News," (Anne Murray), "You Look So Good in Love" (George Strait),  "I Know a Heartache When I See One" (Jennifer Warnes),  and "Come Next Monday" (K. T. Oslin). Most of his songs were written in collaboration with other songwriters.  Charlie Black is a frequent writing partner and he has also written hits with Oslin, Mike Reid, Eddie Rabbitt, Deborah Allen, and a number of others.

Bourke was inducted into the Nashville Songwriters Hall of Fame in 1989. His awards include three times as ASCAP's "Writer of the Year" (1975, 1979, 1983) and three Grammy nominations for Best Country Song. He has also won 11 BMI performance award and over 45 ASCAP performance awards.

References

External links 
 

1942 births
American country songwriters
American male songwriters
American music publishers (people)
Musicians from Cleveland
Living people
Musicians from Nashville, Tennessee
Songwriters from Tennessee
Songwriters from Ohio